Tsoede, also known as Tsudi, Tsade or Edegi or Ichado in Igala language, (b. 1496 c.1591) is a legendary African leader. He was the first person to unite the Nupe people, and is considered the first Etsu Nupe, ruler of the Nupe Kingdom, between the Niger and Kaduna rivers in what is now central Nigeria.

His father was a prince of Igala, and his mother was a Nupe maiden. He was brought up among the Nupe. The Igala people required a regular tribute of slaves from the Nupe, and Tsoede was sent as a slave to the Igala capital Idah. There, he was recognised by his father, now the Atta (king), and his father took him into his palace. He rose in favour and became heir apparent, but was forced to flee after the father's death.

He settled in Nupeko, where he killed the chief – his uncle – and made himself ruler. He united all the Nupe people to throw off the Igala yoke, and as the Etsu of Nupe established the Nupe Kingdom.

Tsoede is credited with bringing the art of bronze casting and making canoes to the Nupe.

He died on a military expedition in 1591 in an unknown geographical location.

References

1591 deaths
16th-century monarchs in Africa
16th-century Nigerian people
Etsu Nupe